The 1981 Ladies European Tour was the third season of golf tournaments organised by the Women's Professional Golfers' Association (WPGA), which later became the Ladies European Tour (LET). There were 13 tournaments on the schedule including four Carlsberg sponsored events and the Women's British Open, organised by the Ladies' Golf Union.

For the 1982 season, the majority of tournaments were increased to 54-holes, having previously been held over 36-holes. This included the Carlsberg events, which were reduced in number, from ten down to four, in order to increase the prize funds at each event. Total prize money on the tour was planned to rise to £250,000 in 1981, but the tour suffered financially during the season as several tournaments were cancelled after sponsors withdrew their support.

The Order of Merit was won by Jenny Lee Smith, who dominated the season with three wins and four runner-up finishes; her £13,518 in prize money put her more than £5,000 clear of runner-up Cathy Panton. The Carlsberg European Championship overall title was won by Panton, who won two of the four events.

Tournaments
The table below shows the 1981 schedule. The numbers in brackets after the winners' names show the number of career wins they had on the Ladies European Tour up to and including that event. This is only shown for members of the tour.

Major championship in bold.

Order of Merit
The Order of Merit was sponsored by Hambro Life and based on prize money won throughout the season.

See also
1981 LPGA Tour

References

External links
Official site of the Ladies European Tour

Ladies European Tour
Ladies European Tour
Ladies European Tour